One Tree Point may refer to:
A locality within Padstow Heights, New South Wales, Australia.
One Tree Point, New Zealand, a small urban area in Northland region.